Li Mingzhu (born on October 30, 1962) is a Chinese figure skater and World and Olympic figure skating coach. She coached Chen Lu to her World title and her first Olympic bronze medal. Currently, Li works at the East West Ice Palace in Artesia, California.

Her current and former students include Chen Lu, Caroline Zhang, Geng Bingwa, Zhang Kexin, and Li Zijun.

References

External links

Chinese female single skaters
Chinese figure skating coaches
1962 births
Living people
American figure skating coaches
American sportswomen
People from Artesia, California
Sportspeople from Los Angeles County, California
Female sports coaches
Sportspeople from Yantai
Figure skaters from Shandong
21st-century American women